

The Men's combined road race / time trial cycling events at the 2004 Summer Paralympics were held at Vouliagmeni between 24 & 27  September.

Each class cycled in a time trial and a road race, held on different days. Rankings were determined by adding the finishing positions in the two races, if this produced ties the aggregate times were used as tie-breakers.

B 1-3

The B1-3 event was won by Vasili Shaptsiaboi and his sighted pilot Aliaksandr Danilik, representing .

Road race 25 Sept. 2004, 10:00. Time trial 27 Sept. 2004, 14:05.

Final ranking

CP 3

The CP3 event was won by Javier Otxoa, representing .

Road race 24 Sept. 2004, 11:50. Time trial 27 Sept. 2004, 11:40.

Final ranking

CP 4

The CP4 event was won by Christopher Scott, representing .

Road race 24 Sept. 2004, 11:50. Time trial 27 Sept. 2004, 11:50.

Final ranking

LC 1

The LC1 event was won by Wolfgang Eibeck, representing .

Road race 25 Sept. 2004, 13:10. Time trial 27 Sept. 2004, 11:23.

Final ranking

LC 2

The LC2 event was won by Jirí Ježek, representing .

Road race 25 Sept. 2004, 15:30. Time trial 27 Sept. 2004, 11:08.

Final ranking

LC 3

The LC3 event was won by Antonio Garcia, representing .

Road race 25 Sept. 2004, 13:10. Time trial 27 Sept. 2004, 10:53.

Final ranking

LC 4

The LC4 event was won by Michael Teuber, representing .

Road race 25 Sept. 2004, 15:30. Time trial 27 Sept. 2004, 10:45.

Final ranking

References

M
2004 in road cycling
Vouliagmeni Olympic Centre events